Osteoglossiformes  (Greek: "bony tongues") is a relatively primitive order of ray-finned fish that contains two sub-orders, the Osteoglossoidei and the Notopteroidei. All of at least 245 living species inhabit freshwater. They are found in South America, Africa, Australia and southern Asia, having first evolved in Gondwana before that continent broke up. In 2008 several new species of marine osteoglossiforms was described from the Danish Eocene Fur Formation dramatically increases the diversity of this group. This implies that the Osteoglossomorpha is not a primary freshwater fish group with the osteoglossiforms having a typical Gondwana distribution.  

The Gymnarchidae (the only species being Gymnarchus niloticus, the African knifefish) and the Mormyridae are weakly electric fish able to sense their prey using electric fields.

The mooneyes (Hiodontidae) are often classified here, but may also be placed in a separate order, Hiodontiformes.

Members of the order are notable for having toothed or bony tongues, and for having the forward part of the gastrointestinal tract pass to the left of the oesophagus and stomach (for all other fish it passes to the right).

Phylogeny
Phylogeny based on the following works:

References

External links 

 
 Osteoglossiforms for aquaria
 Li, Guo-Qing and Wilson, Mark V. H. 1998. Osteoglossomorpha. Bonytongues. Version 6 October 1998.  in The Tree of Life Web Project
 

 
Extant Late Jurassic first appearances
Ray-finned fish orders
Taxa named by Lev Berg